Coal Run is an unincorporated community in northeastern Waterford Township, Washington County, Ohio, United States.  It has a post office with the ZIP code 45721.  It is located along State Route 60 between the villages of Beverly and Lowell.  The Muskingum River flows past the community.

History
Coal Run was laid out and platted in 1838, and named after a nearby stream of the same name noted for its coal deposits. A post office called Coal Run was established in 1837, and remained in operation until 1997.

In 1996, Coal Run was declared a historic district and listed on the National Register of Historic Places. A range of architectural styles are present in the district, including the Federal and Victorian styles. Varied as well are the uses of the buildings: many houses are present, but shops, a post office, and a cemetery are also included within its boundaries. One of the community's residences is known as the Mason House; built in 1802, it is listed on the National Register by itself as well as qualifying as a contributing property to the district.

References

External links

Unincorporated communities in Washington County, Ohio
National Register of Historic Places in Washington County, Ohio
Historic districts on the National Register of Historic Places in Ohio
Unincorporated communities in Ohio